Margot Bailet (born 25 July 1990) is a French alpine ski racer.

She competed at the 2015 World Championships in Beaver Creek, USA, in the Super-G.

References

External links

1990 births
French female alpine skiers
Living people